The 2013 League of Ireland First Division season was the 29th season of the League of Ireland First Division. The First Division was contested by 8 teams and Athlone Town won the title.

Teams

Overview
The 2013 First Division featured eight teams. Each team played every other team twice, totalling 28 games.

Final table

Results

Matches 1–14

Matches 15–28

Promotion/relegation play-off
The second and third placed First Division teams, Longford Town and Mervue United, played off to decide who would play Bray Wanderers, the eleventh placed team from the Premier Division. The winner of this play off would play in the 2014 Premier Division. 
First Division 

The play-off finished 3–3 on aggregate. Longford Town won 3–0 on penalties
First Division v Premier Division

Bray Wanderers win 5–4 on aggregate and retained their place in the Premier Division.

Goal scorers

Top scorers

Hat-Tricks

Awards

Player of the Year

Team of the Year

See also
 2013 League of Ireland Premier Division
 2013 League of Ireland Cup

References

 
League of Ireland First Division seasons
2013 League of Ireland
2013 in Republic of Ireland association football leagues
Ireland
Ireland